The Russian National Party or Russian People's Party, founded in 1900, was a political party created by Western Ukrainian Russophiles in the Austro-Hungarian Kingdom of Galicia and Lodomeria to represent their interests. It represented radicalization among western Ukrainian Russophiles towards the end of the 19th and beginning of the twentieth centuries, promoting the standard literary Russian language without local linguistic features and conversion to Russian Orthodoxy.  The Russian National Party had ties to Russian nationalist parties in the Russian Empire and received subsidies from the Russian government.  Its members actively helped the Russian administration during its rule in western Ukraine during the first world war.

In parliamentary elections, it was a member of the Ukrainian parliamentary association of Austria-Hungary.

 1907 Cisleithanian legislative election
 1911 Cisleithanian legislative election

Notes

Political parties in Austria-Hungary
Political history of Russia
Russophile Movement in Western Ukraine
History of Eastern Galicia
Political parties established in 1900
Russian nationalist parties
Ethnic organizations based in Austria-Hungary
Interwar minority parties in Czechoslovakia